Colby Cut (also known as Roseville Cut) is one of a number of cuts on the Lackawanna Cut-Off railroad line in northwest New Jersey. Located between approximately mileposts 51.8 and 52.3 in Byram Township, the cut was constructed between 1908 and 1911 by contractor David W. Flickwir. (During construction, Lackawanna Railroad Chief Engineer, Lincoln Bush, would leave the railroad and join Flickwir's construction company to form the Flickwir & Bush construction company.) The cut was the result of the removal of 462,342 cubic yards of fill material within this section.

Colby Cut is named for F.G. Colby, from whom some of the land comprising the cut was acquired, west of what would be Roseville Tunnel. In March 1906, Colby, proposed to Lackawanna President William Truesdale for the railroad to locate a train station for the Cut-Off on his property near what was referred to as Roseville Lake (probably Wright's Pond, which is just east and north of the tunnel). Truesdale had Colby contact the chief engineer, Lincoln Bush, to investigate the idea, but the proposal appears to have gone no further.

The cut-off's route was finalized on September 1, 1906. In the months prior, an alternate route was considered (Line "M") that would have proceeded north of where the tunnel would be located, avoiding the need for both the massive cut and the similarly massive Pequest Fill. Line M was rejected because its several-mile, curvaceous sweep to the south near Tranquility, NJ, would be operationally slower.

Colby Cut is located on a tangent (straight) section of right-of-way, permitting , and is just east of the Pequest Fill and just west of Roseville Tunnel. This section is scheduled to receive a single track as part of the reactivation of the line, which was abandoned in 1982 and the tracks removed in 1984. Colby Cut will be cleared as part of the Roseville Tunnel project by NJ Transit, whose rail service is projected to begin in 2026. The cut will have rockfall mitigation installed as well as improved drainage.

References 

Lackawanna Cut-Off